Atlantic chub mackerel (Scomber colias), also known as Tinker mackerel, is a pelagic schooling species of mackerel found in the Atlantic Ocean, the Mediterranean Sea, and the Black Sea. It was originally thought to be a subspecies of the chub mackerel Scomber japonicus colias.

Description
The Atlantic chub mackerel is a long, streamlined fish with a deeply forked tail, is all covered with very small fish scale. The first dorsal fin has 9 or 10 spines and is separated from the second dorsal fin by a space at least as long as its base. The origin of the anal fin is directly below or just behind the origin of the second dorsal fin. This fish is silvery in colour, the upper surface has oblique zigzagging lines while the belly is paler and spotted or marked with wavy lines.

Ecology 
Atlantic chub mackerel and other members of the genus Auxis are important pelagic forage species.

Fisheries

This fish is particularly abundant in the eastern Mediterranean.  Two variants are distinguished: in the late summer and autumn, the fish is fat and roe-filled, whereas in the late winter and spring it is very lean, almost emaciated.  The Greek names for the two forms are koliós and tsíros, respectively.  They are usually roasted, although the former form is often packed in salt for later consumption. The fish releases its own oil into the salt packing and acquires a very long shelf life.  In the islands of the Aegean, it is a particularly popular delicacy, under the name goúna: fresh-caught mackerel is split open at the belly, eviscerated, and left to dry flesh-side up in the sun for one day.  The same evening it is very briefly seared over a fire and then served with lemon juice.

Along the eastern seaboard of North America Atlantic chub mackerel were not the target of directed commercial fisheries until 2013 when commercial trawlers began targeting them because of a lack of squid. Landings went from almost zero to 5m pounds within the year.

Status
This fish has a wide range and is abundant over parts of that range. Although it is heavily fished in places, the population seems relatively stable and the IUCN has listed this species as Least Concern.

References

Links
 Scomber colias at FishBase
 USDOI: Fishes of the Gulf of Maine

Atlantic chub mackerel
Fish of the Atlantic Ocean
Fish of the Mediterranean Sea
Fish of the Black Sea
Atlantic chub mackerel
Atlantic chub mackerel